The 2013 Arab League Summit was held in Doha, Qatar from 21 to 27 March 2013.

On 26 March, the League recognised the 
National Coalition for Syrian Revolutionary and Opposition Forces, as the legitimate representatives of the Syrian people. The National Coalition was henceforth granted Damascus' seat at the summit. This act of recognition was opposed by Algeria, Iraq & Lebanon.

References

2013
2013 in Qatar
21st-century diplomatic conferences (MENA)
2013 in international relations
2013 conferences
Diplomatic conferences in Qatar
21st century in Doha
March 2013 events in Asia